Roland Schlinger (born 17 September 1982) is an Austrian handball player for Alpla HC Hard and the Austrian national team.

References

1982 births
Living people
Austrian male handball players
Austrian expatriate sportspeople in Spain
Handball players from Vienna